Clarence Emil "Bud" Anderson (born January 13, 1922) is a retired officer in the United States Air Force, a triple ace of World War II, and the oldest and highest scoring living American fighter ace.  During the war he was the highest scoring flying ace in his P-51 Mustang squadron.  Towards the end of Anderson's two combat tours in Europe in 1944 he was promoted to major at 22, a young age even for a highly effective officer in wartime. After the war Anderson became a well regarded fighter test pilot, and a fighter squadron and wing commander. He served his wing commander tour in combat in the Vietnam War. He retired as a full colonel in 1972, after which he worked in flight test management for McDonnell Douglas. A member of the National Aviation Hall of Fame, Anderson has remained a sought-after speaker at aviation and military events well into his 90s.

On December 2, 2022, Anderson was promoted to the honorary rank of brigadier general by Gen. CQ Brown Jr., the Air Force chief of staff at the Aerospace Museum of California.

Early life
Anderson was born in Oakland, California, and reared on a farm near Newcastle, California. In high school, he played football and basketball. He was introduced to aviation at Oakland Municipal Airport. Anderson was working at the Sacramento Air Depot when the Japanese attacked Pearl Harbor on December 7, 1941
.

Military career
In January 1942, he enlisted in the United States Army as an aviation cadet. He completed Primary Flight Training at Lindbergh Field, San Diego, and his Advanced Training at Luke Field, Arizona. Anderson received his wings and commission as a second lieutenant in the United States Army Air Forces at Hamilton Field, California in September 1942.

Anderson began flying Bell P-39 Airacobras with the 329th Fighter Squadron of the 328th Fighter Group at Hamilton Field and then at the Oakland Municipal Airport, from September 1942 to March 1943. He was later assigned to the 363rd Fighter Squadron of the 357th Fighter Group at Tonopah, Nevada, in March 1943, moving to various bases in California from May to October 1943, then at Casper, Wyoming, from October to November 1943, and finally deploying to England in November 1943.

World War II
The 357th Fighter Group was stationed at RAF Leiston, and the group was equipped with the North American P-51 Mustang in January 1944. Anderson flew his first mission on February 5, 1944. On March 3, 1944, he shot down a Messerschmitt Bf 109 that was attacking a straggling B-17 Flying Fortress over Berlin, his first aerial victory. Anderson continued to score aerial victories until he shot down a Bf 109 over Frankfurt, his fifth aerial victory, thus making him a flying ace.

On June 29, 1944, Anderson shot down three Focke-Wulf Fw 190s over Leipzig. In July 1944, he took leave and returned to the United States. In Fall 1944, he returned to 357th FG and continued to score aerial victories. He scored his final aerial victories on December 5, 1944, when he shot down two Fw 190s over Berlin.

Anderson flew two tours of combat against the Luftwaffe in Europe while with the 363d Fighter Squadron of the 357th Fighter Group, based at RAF Leiston, England, and was the group's third leading ace with  aerial victories. The others only flew one tour so they had less time in the air. His P-51 Mustang, (P-51B-15-NA AAF Ser. No. 43-24823) the P-51D-10-NA Mustang, AAF Ser. No. 44-14450 B6-S, again nicknamed Old Crow (after the whiskey of the same name), carried him safely through 116 missions without being hit by fire from enemy aircraft and without Anderson ever having to turn back for any reason.

Post war

Anderson returned to the U.S. in January 1945, serving at Perrin Field, Texas, until October 1945, when he was assigned as a recruiter in Ohio. Anderson served as a test pilot at Wright Field from May 1948 to February 1953. During this time, he took part in the FICON project, a concept to increase the effective combat radius of jet fighters by attaching them to a propeller-driven bomber, one hooked up to each wingtip. The hope was that it would not only increase fuel efficiency and effective range, but also allow the bomber to carry its own fighter escort deep into enemy territory.

Anderson attended Air Command and Staff College at Maxwell Air Force Base, Alabama, from September 1954 to August 1955, and then was assigned as Director of Operations for the 58th Fighter-Bomber Wing at Osan Air Base, South Korea, from August 1955 to February 1956 and commander of the 69th Fighter-Bomber Squadron of the from February to August 1956.

Anderson continued serve as test pilot and was assigned as Assistant Chief and then Chief of the Flight Test Operations Division at Edwards Air Force Base from November 1957 to August 1962. He attended the Army War College at Carlisle Barracks, Pennsylvania, from August 1962 to July 1963.

From June to December 1970, he commanded the 355th Tactical Fighter Wing, an F-105 Thunderchief unit, during its final months of service in the Vietnam War. Stationed at Takhli Royal Thai Air Force Base, Anderson flew strikes against enemy supply lines, and later was in charge of closing the base when 355th TFW was inactivated.

Anderson retired as a colonel in March 1972. He was decorated 25 times for his service to the United States. During his career, he flew over 100 types of aircraft and logged over 7,000 hours. Anderson was a close friend of Brigadier General Chuck Yeager during the end of World War II, where both served in the 357th Fighter Group.

Personal life and retirement

Anderson married Eleanor Cosby, on February 23, 1945. She died on January 30, 2015, in Auburn, California, just four days before her 92nd birthday.

After his retirement from active duty as a colonel, he became the manager of the McDonnell Aircraft Company's Flight Test Facility at Edwards AFB, serving there until 1998.

In 1990, Anderson co-authored the book To Fly & Fight—Memoirs of a Triple Ace.

On July 19, 2008, Anderson was inducted into the National Aviation Hall of Fame.

In 2013, Anderson was inducted into the International Air & Space Hall of Fame at the San Diego Air & Space Museum.

He turned 100 in January 2022.
Anderson's hometown Auburn honored him with a grand celebration. He is the last living American triple flying ace of WW2.

Aerial victory credits

SOURCES: Air Force Historical Study 85: USAF Credits for the Destruction of Enemy Aircraft, World War II

Awards
During his lengthy career, Anderson earned many decorations, including:

  Command pilot

American Fighter Aces Association life member
Fellow, Society of Experimental Test Pilots
Aerospace Walk of Honor, 1993
Crystal Eagle Award, 2011
Congressional Gold Medal, May 2015

Bibliography
Anderson, Colonel Clarence "Bud" with Joseph P. Hamelin. To Fly and Fight, Memoirs of a Triple Ace, Pacifica Military History, Library of Congress.

References

External links

To Fly and Fight - C.E. "Bud" Anderson's Official website
Biography at acepilots.com
Images including contemporary photos and paintings
Auburnjournal.com

1922 births
Living people
American World War II flying aces
Aviators from California
Placer High School alumni
People from Oakland, California
Recipients of the Distinguished Flying Cross (United States)
Recipients of the Legion of Merit
United States Air Force officers
United States Air Force personnel of the Vietnam War
Recipients of the Croix de Guerre 1939–1945 (France)
Recipients of the Air Medal
American test pilots
U.S. Air Force Test Pilot School alumni
United States Army Air Forces pilots of World War II
National Aviation Hall of Fame inductees
People from Newcastle, California
Military personnel from California
Chevaliers of the Légion d'honneur
American centenarians
Men centenarians
United States Air Force generals